Sudip Roy is an Indian artist, pursuing arts in the Government College of Art & Craft, Kolkata. Works of Sudip Roy includes pencil sketches and water colours, charcoals and a heady series of landscape done in limped line drawing. Roy over the years mastered the art of water colour and moved from landscapes to studies of architectural facades and association of people in historic temples and monuments. He moved to the capital city of Delhi in the mid-1990s.

His subjects remained architectural and figurative for the most part of his life until he shifted to moody momentousness. He started doing large abstracted works, which reflected the times of the day.

Voluminous sweeps of colour, drawing concurrently on still perceptions, with a light hand and the melodious design of colour's vapid vacuous tonality, these works are, as if, Sudip's encounter with the history of realism, abandoning and reconciling into the magic of Abstract Expressionism.

His work of art overlaps maximal instincts as well as expressionist paintings. He discards an insistent flatness in favour of three-dimensionality, turning from the canvas to a series of densely coloured fragments delineated by strong contours.

Life and career

Early life

Sudip Roy was born in Baharampur, West Bengal and came to study at the Government College of Art & Craft, Kolkata. At college, he was known for attracting the attention of early collectors for his stylistic distinction in watercolours and expressionist drawings. He began his career as a young artist painting portraits and bold impressionistic landscapes, and architectural studies.

Career in contemporary art

Drawing upon those influences, he eventually forged the style of modern painting for which he is best known, a successful reinterpretation of traditional lean lithe iconography by way of crisp, clean, modernist lines. He went on to become one of the most celebrated modernists in the history of Indian painting because he had gone through myriad methods including the wash paintings that called for more than a thousand sweeps of wash effect.

He had his first solo show in Delhi in 1996 at Art Today, the exemplare gallery space for artists in Delhi, which hit headlines in the media because he sold out within a few hours. At Art Today were a few architectural watercolours and a few panoramic drawings done from his early college days.

Personal life

He is married to Mitra Roy and has two sons, named Sujat Roy and Sumit Roy. He lives and works between New Delhi, Baroda and Kolkata.

Works over the years

Monkey (Langur) series

Sitting in Behrampore and watching the world around him, he was deeply fascinated by the agile and languorous movements of the langur and their deep primate-like antics-his first series were a host of drawings that were studies of the monkeys. These drawings were clean and crisp sketches that spoke of the beauty of the contour as well as the magic of abstraction that happens when you want to keep lines short and sprightly and sometimes let spaces play within the contours of an impish moment.
He also led this theme to his wash paintings, where he depicted a lot of social commentaries.

Charulata

The Charulata series was a series that was born out of the story by Rabindranath Tagore but one that went beyond because the modern-day woman is one who doesn't care about the stranger who rings the bell or knocks at her door. She is depicted as a graceful feminine being who throws her pallu in careless grace and stands with vegetable-stained hands at the doorway. The Charulata is a woman signified by Sudip as someone who is secretive and shy-'lajja' as the adjective described by the artist, in their being but deeply attractive for their sinuous curves and their loosely folded saris draped in dream-like intensities-bringing back the verve and stylized grace of Satyajit Ray’s film of the same name. Sudip added an elegant twist to his Charulata series with the addition of the mirror that echoed the classic studies of Hemen Majumdar.

Wash Paintings

Sudip did wash paintings during his college days and though it spells great labour and time he has continued to do a number of washes that have caught the attention of collectors and art lovers alike all over the world. His wash paintings included a series of Christs that were done with the quasi abstract feel and the romance of realism born of the vignettes of Da Vinci and Renoir and Reubens. The wispy softness and the strength of the subject are what has always set him apart-this is why his Christ was among the award-winning works at the Florence Biennale.

Abstract

He began on a series of abstractions that were created by listening to music. His understanding of the abstract expressionist movement in the West and his deep feeling for the flowing notes of a raga is what made him create a series of abstracts that looked more like billowing colours blowing in the wind with tiny formations of ideations and imageries that seemed to float in his retinue of rhythms. He went beyond abstraction when he melded polished metallic surfaces with his abstractions in two important shows in the new millennium.

Charitable Work

Sudip supported CRY aiming to restore children's rights. He worked with major designers for a fundraiser for an NGO, Sahan with FDCI.

Kapil Dev’s foundation Khushii organised an auction with Christie’s in which Roy had participated for charity causes including a hospital at Nimrana in Rajasthan and tsunami-hit people in southern India.

His work was also part of the auction that helped raise money for the sculpture of Mahatma Gandhi in London’s Parliament.

Promotional Work

He is the first Indian artist who created and painted the BMW for the German company. Blended as a moody spring of contour and colour the BMW became an enduring symbol of a BMW art car.

Sudip has collaborated with Audi.

Roy painted live to promote Tanishq Jewellery in the year 2002.

During CWG XIX (India), an exhibition was curated by Rupika Chawla to welcome the guests. A print of that work is at Jawaharlal Nehru Stadium Metro.  Even Taj Hotel, Delhi showcased his works to promote CWG.

Awards

1979 Gold Medal from Sahitya Parishad, Calcutta
1981 Govt. College of Arts & Crafts
1982 Gold Medal in All India Fine Art Exhibition of Fine Arts, Calcutta.
1982 Govt. College of Arts & Crafts
1984 Indian Society of Oriental Art
1985 Indian Society of Oriental Art
1986 Indian Society of Oriental Art
1991 AIFACS, Delhi
2011 Lorenzo il Magnifico, Florence

Collections

Museum of Sacred Art, Belgium
Birla Academy of Art and Culture, Kolkata
Indian Embassy, USA
Hero Honda Motors Limited
Bharti Tele-Ventures LTD (BTVL)
Delhi Art College
Government College of Art and Craft
Tata Group
HCL Technologies
Tractors India Ltd.
Jindal Steel and Power Limited
Indian Parliament
Doon School
Dabur India Limited
Tulip Telecom
Kerala Museum, Kochi

Represented in several private and public collections all over the world.

Artworks

His works include:

Victoria Memorial, the colonial classic architecture of the Victoria Memorial and its beauty of the sky and its soft lingering majesty is shown in this study.
Venice, the beauty of Venice lay in the romance of the canals and the gondolas other than the colours of the sunset seeping through his senses.
Benares, the holy city of Benares came alive not just in its people but in the cross cultures of holy mantras and the little umbrellas and the ghats that stand like a silent sentinel.
Dhaba, the little boy at the dhaba or the coal glowing and the teapot or the lanterns that light up the darkness was a series of watercolours done in elegant abstractions.
Christ - Studies of Christ have moved in leaps and bounds with mediums and different compositions that brought the pathos and gravitas of the world’s greatly loved figure.
Mother Teresa - The Saint of the Gutters became an important part of his oeuvre because he believed she gave us a lesson in humanism. Her blue-bordered sari and her compassion are what he strove to capture.
CWG series, a special series done to showcase the beauty of India and love for the sport.
Krishna, the popular god of the Hindu pantheon was a subject of his watercolours as well as oils. The Krishna was not just a blue being but a deity of great humility and simple charisma and charm as she bordered his countenance with petals and lotuses.
Forts - Haunts of history were his mettle as he sketched and painted a series of facades and facets of forts that stood testimony to the ravages of time.
Temples - The inner sanctorum and the quiet incense of the temple always presented a wafting memory to him and he created a series of works that were fragments of the little details of the sojourn that is spiritual.
Sadhu - In the past, he has spent time with many sadhus in the city of Benares and his proximity gave him gleanings that invited many a composition in the hard life of the ascetic.
Kettle-The humble kettle which is used to make tea in the dhabas of little villages and towns was an important part of his still life studies as he captured the tint and the alloyed reality of the kettle with its smoky stains.
Hookah - The symbolism of the hookah and the puffs of smoke that filled the atmosphere is a composition that sometimes held its own.
Lantern - The quaint and humble lantern with its ashen glass and its little rusty nuances made a still life that spoke of the beauty of simplicity.
Calcutta - The City of Joy has held many secrets and tableaux to his sheets of paper or canvasses in the past. Calcutta has had its richness as a classic colonial city that offered many things to many people.
Bombay - The city of Bombay had its own charm and charisma with its British colonial insets and architectural detailings that spoke differently in the shades of the setting sun or the sunrise-even as the waves of the sea whispered its own entity.
Durga - The magnificence of Durga is the story of good and evil-the story of the power of victory and the essence of the triumph of worship.

References

External links
 Official website

1960 births
Living people
Indian contemporary painters
Indian male painters
20th-century Indian painters
21st-century Indian painters
Indian portrait painters
Indian watercolourists
Mixed-media artists
Indian multimedia artists
Modern artists
Abstract painters
Government College of Art & Craft alumni
Bengali male artists
Painters from West Bengal
20th-century Indian male artists
21st-century Indian male artists